Jay Phillip McGraw (born September 12, 1979) is an American writer and television producer. He has written several books aimed at young people and is president and CEO of Stage 29 Productions. He is the son of celebrity therapist Phil McGraw and has appeared on and served as executive producer on his father's television show Dr. Phil.

Early life and education
Jay McGraw was born in Wichita County, Texas on September 12, 1979, to Dr. Phil McGraw and his wife Robin. He attended Greenhill School and is a graduate of the University of Texas at Austin, receiving a BS in psychology. He earned his JD from Southern Methodist University.

Career
McGraw is president and CEO of Stage 29 Productions in Los Angeles, a company he co-founded with his father. He appeared as host of Renovate My Family, which aired on Fox. He is executive producer of the television series The Doctors.

In 2010 McGraw launched RumorFix, an anti-tabloid website that examines tabloid rumors and stories to verify whether or not they are factual. If a story is deemed true, the website labels it as "It's True", with unconfirmed rumors marked as "Still a Rumor" and false rumors marked with "RumorFixed". Mediaite commented that the site was very similar to Gossip Cop, a pre-existing website that also specialized in investigating whether or not celebrity rumors were true or false.

Personal life
McGraw married Playboy model Erica Dahm at his parents' home in Beverly Hills on August 12, 2006. A reception for 400 guests followed the ceremony at the Beverly Hills Hotel. In March 2010, Dahm gave birth to the couple's first child, a daughter named Avery Elizabeth. In March 2011, McGraw and his wife announced they were expecting their second child. Dahm gave birth to a son, London Phillip, in August 2011.

Filmography
Moochers (2007)

Bibliography
 Closing The Gap: A Strategy for Bringing Parents and Teens Together (2001) 
 Life Strategies For Teens (2000) 
 Life Strategies For Teens Workbook 
 Daily Life Strategies for Teens (2001) 
 The Ultimate Weight Solution for Teens (co-authored with Dr. Phil) (2003)

References

External links

1979 births
21st-century American non-fiction writers
American aviators
American chief executives
American male non-fiction writers
American male taekwondo practitioners
American self-help writers
American television talk show hosts
Greenhill School alumni
Living people
People from Wichita County, Texas
Southern Methodist University alumni
University of Texas at Austin College of Liberal Arts alumni
21st-century American male writers